Juan Fernando Hermosa Suárez (February 28, 1976 - February 28, 1996), known as Niño del Terror, was the youngest serial killer in the history of Ecuador.

Early life 
Hermosa was born on February 28, 1976, in the city of Clemente Baquerizo, Los Ríos Province. He was adopted by Olivo Hermosa Fonseca and Zoila Amada Suárez Mejía, who took him to live in a populous neighborhood north of Quito. Hermosa was often looked after by his deaf adoptive mother, who also suffered from arthritis, while his adoptive father travelled around the Sucumbíos Province, where he owned properties.

Crimes 
At 15 years of age, he began leading a gang of ten youngsters of the same age, frequenting the videogame shops in the La Marín sector, in downtown Quito. He often went to bars and clubs in the area known as Puente del Guambra, near the Central University.

Murders 
While leaving a discothèque with friends on November 22, 1991, the group took a taxi from the San Remo brand, and after reaching 10 de Agosto Avenue, Hermosa pulled out a 9mm pistol obtained through a guard, shooting the driver in the head and killing him instantly. A week later, Hermosa went with other members of his gang to a hairdresser where he usually fixed his hair, operated by a transvestite named Charlie, south of the city. Charlie invited them to drink at home, where they started an argument which ended in Hermosa shooting Charlie five times before she could ask for help.

Hermosa's crimes totaled 22 murders, occurring in only four months, claiming the lives of 8 taxi drivers, 11 homosexuals, a truck driver and his acquaintance, as well as two others, earning him the nickname "Niño del Terror". The victims were shot to death with the 9mm pistol, the crimes occurring during the weekends, which caused a panic among the taxi drivers and homosexuals who lived in northern Quito.

Capture 
The mayor Fausto Terán Bustillos was put in command of a squad formed by the Grupo de Intervención y Rescate (GIR) of the National Police, which was in charge of investigating Niño del Terror's crimes. Police managed to catch a group of young criminals in the city center who tried to rob a place, revealing information about the identity of whoever was behind the killings. On January 9, 1992, they located the Hermosa residence, located between América and Diguja Streets, and through an operation which begun on January 16 at 3 o'clock AM. The contingent was located on the exterior of the presumed murderer's house, and the police entered the home through a skylight that determined that it was facing the suspect's room, who was sleeping in his mother's room. The mistake of the police alerted Hermosa, who began shooting at close range with his 9mm pistol, starting a shootout between him and the police. A group of gendarmes who were on the street began throwing grenades, causing an explosion that ended up knocking down the wall of the house on top of two policemen. Hermosa's mother died during the confrontation, shot 11 times, while Hermosa himself was captured 15 minutes later without receiving a scratch, while trying to escape through the back window.

A contingent of ten agents transferred Hermosa to García Moreno prison that same morning, where they were surprised to learn that the suspect was a minor, declared by his own words: "I want to make it clear that my name is Juan Fernando Hermosa Suárez and that on February 28, I will be 16 years old". He claimed in his statements that he had no intent of killing, as he had asked his victims to be quiet and that nothing would happen to them, but by ignoring that warning, they ended their lives. Hermosa said that on one occasion he was threatened with a .22 caliber revolver, and on another occasion a taxi driver had tried to attack him with a wheel wrench, so he had to kill them with his gun.

Condemnation, escape and recapture 
He was sentenced to the maximum penalty that the law allowed for a minor, which is four years imprisonment at the Virgilio Guerrero Rehabilitation Center, after confessing to his crimes. However, he became a juvenile leader in prison in the first 16 months, even managing to obtain a pistol through his girlfriend Yadira, with which he killed a policeman attempting to stop him by shooting him five times, before escaping from prison with ten young boys on June 17, 1993. He fled to Colombia, where he contracted tonsillitis. He was recaptured and released after serving his sentence in 1996.

Death 
After his release, he went to live with his father in Nueva Loja, Sucumbíos. On the day of his 20th birthday, he was found dead on the banks of the Aguarico River. It was revealed by police that five hooded individuals were responsible for the murder, managing to identify Hermosa through documents in his wallet, as his face was disfigured and with signs of torture, cut with machetes and riddled with bullets.

Documentary 
In 2011, the documentary Tras las sombras del niño del terror, directed, produced and written by Vladimir and Marco Soasti, premiered.

See also 

 List of serial killers by country
 List of serial killers by number of victims
 List of youngest killers

References

External links
 Criminalia Article

1976 births
1996 deaths
Ecuadorian murder victims
Ecuadorian people convicted of murder
Ecuadorian serial killers
Male serial killers
Murdered serial killers
People from Los Ríos Province
People murdered in Ecuador
Violence against gay men